José Bardina (March 27, 1939 – December 18, 2009) was a Spanish-Venezuelan actor who was a television leading figure.

A native of Barcelona, Spain, Bardina was raised in Caracas, Venezuela.

Television career
He was best known for playing major roles on several soap operas, and was best loved by audiences for his natural charm and the romantic rapport he shared with his female co-stars, like Marina Baura, Lupita Ferrer and Doris Wells.

He was popular in Venezuela, and also in Colombia, Mexico, Peru, Puerto Rico and Spain, after the telenovelas produced by Radio Caracas Televisión and Venevisión reached its peak during the 1970s decade.

Death
Bardina died in Miami, Florida at the age of 70, following complications from bladder cancer.

Selected appearances
Lucecita (1967)
Doña Bárbara [TV series] (1967)
Esmeralda (1970)
María Teresa (1972)
Peregrina (1973)
Mi hermana gemela (1975)
Mariana de la noche (1975)
Una muchacha llamada Milagros (1975)
Cumbres Borrascosas (1976)
La zulianita (1977)
La fiera (1978)
Rosangela (1979)
Buenos días, Isabel (1980)
Amor descarado (2003)
Amor comprado (2008)

References

External links

Obituary

1939 births
2009 deaths
Male actors from Caracas
Male actors from Barcelona
Spanish emigrants to Venezuela
Venezuelan people of Catalan descent
Venezuelan male telenovela actors
Spanish male telenovela actors
Venezuelan male television actors
Spanish male television actors
20th-century Venezuelan male actors
21st-century Venezuelan male actors
20th-century Spanish male actors
21st-century Spanish male actors
Deaths from bladder cancer
Deaths from cancer in Florida